The 2017 Leinster Senior Cup was the 116th staging of the Leinster Football Association's primary competition. It included all Leinster based League of Ireland clubs from the First Division and Premier Division, as well as a selection of intermediate level sides. The competition was won by Shelbourne.

Fourth round

Quarter-finals

Semi-finals

Final

References

2017
2017 in Republic of Ireland association football cups